Grant Main (born February 11, 1960 in Victoria, British Columbia) is a Canadian rower, who was a member of the Canadian men's eights team that won the gold medal at the 1984 Summer Olympics in Los Angeles, California. He also competed at the 1988 Summer Olympics. From March 2014, Main served as the Deputy Minister of the British Columbia Ministry of Transportation until his retirement in November 2020.

References

External links
 Canadian Olympic Committee

1960 births
Canadian male rowers
Living people
Olympic gold medalists for Canada
Olympic medalists in rowing
Olympic rowers of Canada
Rowers at the 1984 Summer Olympics
Rowers at the 1988 Summer Olympics
Rowers from Victoria, British Columbia
Medalists at the 1984 Summer Olympics
Commonwealth Games medallists in rowing
Commonwealth Games gold medallists for Canada
Rowers at the 1986 Commonwealth Games
Medallists at the 1986 Commonwealth Games